Gator Growl, produced by Florida Blue Key with artists funded by Student Government Productions, is a student-run pep rally at the University of Florida that was founded in 1924. It marks the culmination of Homecoming Week at the university.

Since 2021, the show has been held annually at the Stephen C. O'Connell Center at the University of Florida. Until 2013, it was held at Ben Hill Griffin Stadium, the on-campus football stadium. From 2014 to 2019, the rally was held on Flavet Field. There was no show held in 2020 due to the COVID-19 pandemic.

Gator Growl is credited with inspiring Orange Peel, a similar event held annually at Oklahoma State University, after a group of students, faculty and alumni traveled to Gainesville in 1995 to witness the event.

History 
Gator Growl has been a University of Florida tradition for almost 100 years.  Gator Growl has its roots in the tradition of "Dad's Day," a turn-of-the-century tradition in which fathers of the then all-male student body were invited to visit the new campus. In 1916, a pep rally replaced Dad's Day and "Gator Growl" was born., known as "firing up" enthusiasm for the next day's football game. In 1923, the tradition grew as skits, musical performances and guest speakers expanded the rally into a variety show.  Students & alumni continued to express their Gator spirit by participating in cheers and enjoying performances by UF's Marching Band, Cheerleaders, and Dazzlers.

Over time, the Gator Growl production grew with the advancement of technology to its current scale. Today, it is a showcase of athletic talent and spirited tradition; a spectacle of fireworks, light displays, live music, and comedy.  More than 500 student volunteers work for thousands of hours to coordinate the night of festivities for the University of Florida community. Producers, directors, assistant directors, and staff members are in charge of the production, execution, promotion, and dismantling of the show.  These student volunteers earn Gator Growl its beloved nickname, "the world's largest student-run pep rally!"

The majority of the manual labor associated with this major production, however, is provided by University of Florida students who work at the Stephen C. O'Connell Center, the University of Florida's indoor sports arena.  The event takes more than a week to physically set up and requires more than 200 student employees to do so. Because Gator Growl is always held the night before a home football game, these students must work all night to remove every trace of the event by the following morning. Like all aspects of Gator Growl, the physical construction is also student-run with primary responsibility falling on the Production Lead—the student technician charged with coordinating and supervising all of the other student employees. The Production Lead and the Head Electrician (also a student) will typically serve as an apprentice to the position the year prior.

As a longstanding tradition at the University of Florida, Gator Growl is a show produced by students for students and alumni. With a vision to reinvent the spectacle into a more interactive, exciting and intimate show while still remaining true to its origins, the event was moved from the Ben Hill Griffin Stadium to Flavet Field in 2014, which offers an environment conducive to executing this vision. The venue change also reduces the need for an extensive single-stage setup, thus making the event tremendously more cost-effective.

In its long history, Gator Growl has been recognized by Good Morning America, Comedy Central, Entertainment Tonight and was even featured as an answer on Jeopardy!.

Content 

The main purpose of the pep rally is to motivate the Florida Gators to victory in their Homecoming football game. The show features performances from the UF Dazzlers, the University of Florida cheerleaders, and The Pride of the Sunshine marching band.

In addition to the cheers, there are performances from guest comedians, musicians, and entertainers who perform for the assembled students and alumni.

A special portion of the show is reserved for celebrity cameo appearances. In the past, cameo appearances have included countless entertainment icons such as David Letterman, Katie Couric, "Nature Boy" Ric Flair, Jonah Hill, and B.o.B.

List of comedians and performers

References 

Historical voice of Gator Growl Karl Kaufmann, a 39-year tradition continues with his daughter Kelli Kaufmann https://www.youtube.com/watch?v=tDzer-WI5ec

External links 
Official Website of Gator Growl
Florida Blue Key
Alligator article about Gator Growl
Official Website of University of Florida Homecoming
Stephen C. O'Connell Center

University of Florida
1923 establishments in Florida
Recurring events established in 1923